

Archosauromorphs

Newly named basal archosauromorphs

Dinosaurs

Newly named dinosaurs
Data courtesy of George Olshevsky's dinosaur genera list.

Crocodylomorphs

Newly named crocodylomorphs

Fish

Newly named fish

References

1830s in paleontology
Paleontology, 1830 In